The 1928 United States Senate special election in Ohio was held on November 6, 1928 to elect a successor to Frank B. Willis, who died in office in March 1928. Republican U.S. Representative Theodore E. Burton, who previously held this seat from 1909 to 1915, won the open race to succeed him.

Background
Incumbent Republican Senator Frank B. Willis died in office on March 30, 1928. Governor of Ohio Vic Donahey appointed Cyrus Locher to fill the vacant seat until a successor could be duly elected. The special election to fill the seat was scheduled for November 6, 1928, concurrent with the general election for President of the United States, Governor, and Ohio's other U.S. Senate seat.

General election

Candidates
Israel Amter (Workers)
Theodore E. Burton, U.S. Representative from Cleveland and former U.S. Senator (1909–15)
Graham P. Hunt (Democratic)
Anna K. Storck (Socialist Labor)

Results

See also 
 1928 United States Senate elections

References

1928
Ohio
United States Senate
Ohio 1928
Ohio 1928
United States Senate 1928